The Thoeny Hills,  el. , is a set of hills northeast of Malta, Montana in Phillips County, Montana.

See also
 List of mountain ranges in Montana

Notes

Mountain ranges of Montana
Landforms of Phillips County, Montana